46th New York Film Critics Circle Awards
January 25, 1981

Best Film: 
 Ordinary People 
The 46th New York Film Critics Circle Awards honored the best filmmaking of 1980. The winners were announced on 30 December 1980 and the awards were given on 25 January 1981.

Winners
Best Actor:
Robert De Niro - Raging Bull
Runners-up: Robert Duvall - The Great Santini and Peter O'Toole - The Stunt Man
Best Actress:
Sissy Spacek - Coal Miner's Daughter
Runners-up: Goldie Hawn - Private Benjamin and Mary Tyler Moore - Ordinary People
Best Cinematography:
Geoffrey Unsworth and Ghislain Cloquet - Tess
Best Director:
Jonathan Demme - Melvin and Howard
Runners-up: Martin Scorsese - Raging Bull and Robert Redford - Ordinary People
Best Documentary:
Best Boy
Best Film:
Ordinary People
Runners-up: Melvin and Howard and Raging Bull
Best Foreign Film:
Mon Oncle d'Amérique • France
Runners-up: Breaker Morant • Australia and Tess • France/UK
Best Screenplay:
Bo Goldman - Melvin and Howard
Runners-up: Jean Gruault - Mon Oncle d'Amérique and John Sayles - Return of the Secaucus 7
Best Supporting Actor:
Joe Pesci - Raging Bull
Runners-up: Jason Robards - Melvin and Howard and Timothy Hutton - Ordinary PeopleBest Supporting Actress:'''
Mary Steenburgen - Melvin and HowardRunners-up: Debra Winger - Urban Cowboy and Mary Nell Santacroce - Wise Blood''

References

External links
1980 Awards

1980
New York Film Critics Circle Awards, 1980
New York Film Critics Circle Awards
New York Film Critics Circle Awards
New York Film Critics Circle Awards
New York Film Critics Circle Awards